Moen is the administrative centre of Målselv Municipality in Troms og Finnmark county, Norway.

The village is lies along the Målselva river and the European route E6 crosses through the village with the Olsborg area in the north and the Moen area in the south. Most of the shops and schools are located in Olsborg, while the municipal offices are located in Moen.

References

Villages in Troms
Målselv
Populated places of Arctic Norway